The meridian 26° west of Greenwich is a line of longitude that extends from the North Pole across the Arctic Ocean, Greenland, the Atlantic Ocean, the Southern Ocean, and Antarctica to the South Pole.

The 26th meridian west forms a great circle with the 154th meridian east.

From Pole to Pole
Starting at the North Pole and heading south to the South Pole, the 26th meridian west passes through:

{| class="wikitable plainrowheaders"
! scope="col" width="120" | Co-ordinates
! scope="col" width="160" | Country, territory or sea
! scope="col" | Notes
|-
| style="background:#b0e0e6;" | 
! scope="row" style="background:#b0e0e6;" | Arctic Ocean
| style="background:#b0e0e6;" |
|-
| 
! scope="row" | 
| Northern Peary Land
|-
| style="background:#b0e0e6;" | 
! scope="row" style="background:#b0e0e6;" | Frederick E. Hyde Fjord
| style="background:#b0e0e6;" |
|-
| 
! scope="row" | 
| Southern Peary Land
|-
| style="background:#b0e0e6;" | 
! scope="row" style="background:#b0e0e6;" | Independence Fjord
| style="background:#b0e0e6;" |
|-
| 
! scope="row" | 
|
|-
| style="background:#b0e0e6;" | 
! scope="row" style="background:#b0e0e6;" | Hagen Fjord
| style="background:#b0e0e6;" |
|-
| 
! scope="row" | 
| Mainland and the island of Milne Land
|-
| style="background:#b0e0e6;" | 
! scope="row" style="background:#b0e0e6;" | Scoresby Sund
| style="background:#b0e0e6;" |
|-
| 
! scope="row" | 
|
|-valign="top"
| style="background:#b0e0e6;" | 
! scope="row" style="background:#b0e0e6;" | Atlantic Ocean
| style="background:#b0e0e6;" | Passing just west of São Miguel Island, Azores,  (at ) Passing just east of Saunders Island,  (at ) Passing just east of Montagu Island,  (at )
|-
| style="background:#b0e0e6;" | 
! scope="row" style="background:#b0e0e6;" | Southern Ocean
| style="background:#b0e0e6;" |
|-valign="top"
| 
! scope="row" | Antarctica
|-
|}

See also
25th meridian west
27th meridian west

w026 meridian west